The Montreal Wanderers Rugby Football Club is a rugby union club based in Montreal, Quebec, Canada. It was founded in 1957, and is based on the grounds of the Douglas Hospital in Verdun.

Establishment
The Montreal Wanderers Rugby Club was conceived in the Spring of 1957. The Barbarians, the legendary touring allstar team from the UK, had just beaten a team of Quebec select players 41-3 at Delormier stadium in front of 5000 fans. Cliff Morgan, legendary fly half for the Barbarians, was reported to have told his Quebec hosts was that what Canada needed was more clubs. Present at that meeting were several members of the Montreal Scottish RFC (now known as Westmount Rugby Club).

Due to an influx of players, the Montreal Scottish had adopted a Scots-only policy in order to manage their numbers. This left many players from other rugby nations without a home, and Cliff Morgan's suggestion was just the prompting they needed. Players from the Montreal Scottish founded two new clubs; the Montreal Barbarians RFC and the Montreal Wanderers RFC.

The Wanderers played their first match against the Montreal Scottish in the Fall of 1957, and the first tour was held that Thanksgiving to Deep River, 200 km northwest of Ottawa.

Over the first few years of the club's existence, Wanderers' recruitment benefited from the Scots-only policy of the Montreal Scottish RFC. The Wanderers saw their ranks swell to three full squads, which continued through to the mid 60's. With the end of Expo '67, many southern hemisphere Wanderers left Montreal and returned home. The Wanderers dropped from three sides to two in 1968, where they remained until a brief thirds  revival in 2006.

The Founding of Rugby Quebec
The Montreal Wanderers were one of the founding clubs of Rugby Quebec (FRQ in French). Other founding clubs included Montreal Irish Rugby Football Club, Barbarians, Westmount Rugby Club and Town of Mount Royal (TMR). Every one of these clubs continues to this day, fielding teams across multiple levels of the FRQ league.

Canadian National Team
The Montreal Wanderers are the club of origin for several members of the Canadian Senior Men's Team.
He scored a total of 37 tries for Canada between 1998 and 2006, and was part of the Canadian squad at the 2003 Rugby World Cup
 Colin Robertson was capped for both 7s and 15s, receiving his first cap at the Hong Kong 7s on May 24, 1997. He was capped a total of 7 times, scoring 3 tries before retiring from international rugby in 2001
 Keith Wilkinson was the 109th player to be capped for Canada, making his debut against the Barbarians on June 12, 1976. He played with the Wanderers in the early 70's before moving to work in the higher levels of the Rugby Canada administration.

Present Day
The Wanderers currently field two teams in the FRQ men's league, competing against teams from Eastern Ontario and the rest of Quebec.

References

External links
 

Canadian rugby union teams
Rugby union teams in Montreal
Rugby union teams in Quebec